The 1956–57 season was the 42nd in the history of the Isthmian League, an English football competition.

Tooting & Mitcham United were newly admitted from the Athenian League.

Wycombe Wanderers were champions for the second season in a row.

League table

References

Isthmian League seasons
I